Christian Wilhelm Engel Bredal Olssøn (5 April 1844 – 3 November 1915) was a Norwegian  military officer and politician. 

Olssøn was born in Horten in Vestfold, Norway.  He was the son of Edvard Olssøn  (1820–1867) and Leonore Rebecca Bredal (1820–1910). He received a military education at the Norwegian Military Academy (1866) and Norwegian Military College (1870). He received  additional education at the Royal Institute of Technology in Stockholm (1872–1874).

He was appointed major general in 1896. In 1898, he was commander at Oscarsborg, 1899 inspector general for coastal artillery. In 1907, he became lieutenant-general. He retired from military service in 1912 as commanding general. He served as Minister of Defence 1893–1894, 1895–1898, 1905–1907, and member of the Council of State Division in Stockholm 1894–1895.

References

1844 births
1915 deaths
People from Horten
Norwegian Army generals
Norwegian Military Academy alumni
KTH Royal Institute of Technology alumni
Norwegian people of Swedish descent
Defence ministers of Norway